Robert Keith Horry (born August 25, 1970) is an American former professional basketball player and current sports commentator. He played 16 seasons in the National Basketball Association (NBA), winning seven championships, the most of any player not to have played for the Boston Celtics of the 1950s and 1960s. He is one of only four players to have won NBA championships with three teams; he won two with the Houston Rockets, three with the Los Angeles Lakers and two with the San Antonio Spurs with no defeats in NBA Finals. He earned the nickname "Big Shot Rob", because of his clutch shooting in important games; he is widely considered to be one of the greatest clutch performers and winners in NBA history. Horry now works as a commentator on Spectrum SportsNet for the Lakers.

Early life, high school and college basketball
Robert Horry was born in Harford County, Maryland; soon afterwards his father, Staff Sergeant Robert Horry Sr., divorced his mother, Leila, and moved to South Carolina. Horry grew up in Andalusia, Alabama. Later, when Robert Sr. was stationed at Fort Benning, Georgia, the father and son met weekly.

As a senior at Andalusia High School, Horry won the Naismith Alabama High School Player of the Year award. At the University of Alabama, he played basketball for Coach Wimp Sanderson, and he was a teammate of fellow future NBA player Latrell Sprewell.

At Alabama, Horry played from 1988 to 1992.  He started 108 of the 133 games he played and helped the Tide win three SEC tournament titles and twice reached the NCAA's Sweet 16 round. Alabama compiled a 98–36 record during his four seasons. Horry set a school record for career blocked shots (282). He was selected to the All-Southeastern Conference, the SEC All-Defensive and the SEC All-Academic teams. Years later Horry returned to the university to finish his degree and graduated in spring 2021.

NBA career

Houston Rockets (1992–1996)
Horry was selected 11th overall in the 1992 NBA draft by the Houston Rockets as a small forward. He spent his first four seasons with the Rockets, helping them win the NBA Championship in 1994 and 1995. While in the Finals, Horry set an individual NBA Finals record with seven steals in a game and also hit five three-pointers in a quarter. During his years with the Rockets, Horry wore number 25.

Horry's clutch tendencies were apparent as early as his rookie year. In Game 7 of the 1993 Western Conference Semifinals against the Seattle SuperSonics, Horry nailed a clutch jumper with the shot clock expiring and 33 seconds left in regulation to put the Rockets up 93–91. The Rockets, however, would lose in overtime. In February 1994, he and Matt Bullard were traded to the Detroit Pistons for Sean Elliott, but Elliott failed a physical because of kidney problems, so the trade was rescinded. Horry said that the trade falling through probably saved his career. Horry went on to be a key member of the Rockets' title teams and began to build his "Big Shot" reputation with a game-winning jumper with 6.5 seconds left in Game 1 of the 1995 Western Conference Finals versus the San Antonio Spurs and hitting a 3 to put Houston up 104–100 with 14.1 seconds left in a 106–103 win in Game 3 of the NBA Finals against the Orlando Magic. Following the victory at the 1995 NBA Finals, Horry and the Rockets would win their second NBA Championship. Horry said that out of his 7 championship victories, this was the one he was the most proud of because the Rockets were the sixth seed in the Western Conference.

Phoenix Suns (1996–1997)
On August 19, 1996, Horry was traded to the Phoenix Suns along with Sam Cassell, Chucky Brown and Mark Bryant for former NBA Most Valuable Player Charles Barkley. Horry had been criticized in Houston for not taking enough shots and felt that was what prompted the Rockets to trade him. After joining the Suns, Horry had an on-court altercation with coach Danny Ainge, during which Horry threw a towel at Ainge.

Los Angeles Lakers (1997–2003)
The incident with Ainge led to Horry's suspension and trade to the Los Angeles Lakers on January 10, 1997, for Cedric Ceballos. Because the Lakers had retired jersey number 25 to honor Gail Goodrich, Horry wore the number 5 instead.

During the 1999–2000 season, Horry played behind A.C. Green but frequently garnered more minutes off the bench than the starters, especially during the playoffs. In the 2000 Finals against the Indiana Pacers, the Lakers took a 2–1 lead into Game 4 in Indiana. The game went into overtime. Shaquille O'Neal fouled out, but Kobe Bryant led a run to seal the Laker victory. Horry finished with 17 points in 37 minutes, his high for the Finals, and won his third championship as the Lakers defeated the Pacers 4 games to 2. Horry averaged 7.6 points and 5.4 rebounds in 27 minutes per game throughout the 2000 playoffs.

In the 2000–01 season, Horry played behind Horace Grant but once again played big minutes in the playoffs. He played in 16 Lakers 2001 playoffs games, averaging 5.9 points per game. In the Finals against the Philadelphia 76ers, the Lakers dropped Game 1 before winning Game 2. In Game 3 in Philadelphia, Horry scored 12 of his 15 points in the fourth quarter, including a critical three-pointer with 47.1 seconds left in the fourth quarter to make it 92–88, followed by making 1 of 2 free throws with 21 seconds left to help seal a 96–91 Laker victory. In Game 4, Horry made 3 of the Lakers 10 total three-pointers as the Lakers rolled to a 100–86 victory. The Lakers won Game 5 108–96 to clinch their second straight championship. Horry has stated this victory to be the second-proudest of his career, following the 1995 NBA Finals.

In the 2001–02 season, Horry was the backup power forward to Samaki Walker, although he started in 23 games. In the playoffs, Horry started 14 of the Lakers' 19 games playing an average of 37 minutes a game with averages of 9.3 points and 8.1 rebounds a game. Horry's reputation for clutch play was elevated in Game 4 of the 2002 Western Conference Finals against the Sacramento Kings. Trailing two games to one in the series and facing Game 5 in Sacramento, the Lakers were down by as many as 24 points in the first half. Eventually, the Lakers cut the lead to 99–97 with 11.8 seconds to play. On the final possession, after Kobe and Shaq missed consecutive layups, Sacramento center Vlade Divac knocked the ball away from the basket in an attempt to run out the clock. However, the ball bounced right to Horry, who hit a three-pointer as time expired to win Game 4 100–99. A day later, Magic Johnson said Horry was "one of the 10 best clutch players in league history". The Lakers would eventually win the series in 7 games and swept the New Jersey Nets 4–0 in the NBA Finals to complete a three-peat. Horry started all four games in the Finals.

A situation similar to Game 4 happened on March 5, 2003, in a game against the Indiana Pacers when, while the game was tied at 95, Pacers center Jermaine O'Neal swatted the inside pass for Shaquille O'Neal right into the hands of a wide-open Horry, who calmly hit the game-winning shot.

In the 2003 playoffs, the Lakers were attempting to win their fourth straight NBA championship. But in Game 5 in the Western Conference Semifinals against the Spurs, Horry's chance for another game-winner rattled in and out with 5 seconds left, wiping out the Lakers' rally from a 25-point deficit. Horry went 0–18 on three-pointers in the series and the Lakers were eliminated in six games.

San Antonio Spurs (2003–2008)

Following the 2002–03 season, Horry became a free agent. Citing concerns over family, all of whom live in Houston, Horry signed with the San Antonio Spurs. During the 2002–03 season, the Lakers had leaned heavily on Horry. With the Spurs, coach Gregg Popovich cut Horry's minutes significantly, resulting in renewed success. In the 2003–04 season, the Spurs won 57 games and reached the 2004 playoffs where they swept the Memphis Grizzlies in four games, before losing in six games to the Los Angeles Lakers.

During the following season, the Spurs reached the playoffs and went on to win the 2005 NBA Finals. Horry played a significant part in the team's success, going 38 of 85 behind the three-point line in the 2005 playoffs. In Game 5 of the 2005 NBA Finals against the Detroit Pistons, Horry provided more heroics in the fourth quarter to boost San Antonio to a win and 3–2 series lead over Detroit. After only scoring three points in the first three quarters, he scored 21 of the Spurs' points in the fourth quarter and overtime. The Spurs went on to win Game 5 96–95 after Horry hit a game-winning three-point shot with 5.9 seconds left. His late-game heroics at age 34 were so astounding that prominent ESPN columnist Bill Simmons said of the performance, "Horry's Game 5 ranks alongside MJ's Game 6 in 1998, Worthy's Game 7 in 1988, Frazier's Game 7 in 1970 and every other clutch Finals performance over the years". After winning the series in seven games, the Spurs won their third NBA Championship in seven seasons and Horry received his sixth championship ring.

During the 2007 playoffs, Horry hip-checked Phoenix Suns' point guard Steve Nash which resulted in a flagrant foul on Horry. During the ensuing commotion, Raja Bell was assessed a technical foul for charging at Horry. Horry was ejected from the game and suspended for Games 5 and 6. Amar'e Stoudemire and Boris Diaw who left the vicinity of the bench, were issued a suspension for Game 5. The Spurs won the two ensuing games and subsequently moved on to the 2007 NBA Finals, where they swept the Cleveland Cavaliers winning their fourth NBA title and Horry's seventh individual ring.

He began wearing the number 25 again after the 2006–07 season. After the 2007–08 season, Horry became a free agent but went unsigned, marking his last professional season.

Records and honors
Horry collected his seventh championship as a member of the Spurs in 2007. He is one of only nine players to have won seven or more NBA championships, and the only one who did not play on the 1960s Celtics. Horry was one of only four players to have won back-to-back NBA championships with two teams as of 2007. In 2005, he became the second player after John Salley to win the NBA championship with three teams. At the time of his retirement, he was the all-time leader in playoff games played with 244 games through the 2008 playoffs, having surpassed Kareem Abdul-Jabbar.

When he retired Horry held the record for three-pointers all-time in the NBA Finals with 53, having eclipsed Michael Jordan's previous record of 42. He set, and still holds, the NBA playoffs record for most three-point field goals made in a game without a miss (7) against the Utah Jazz in Game 2 of the 1997 Western Conference Semifinals. Horry has regular-season career averages of 7.0 points, 4.8 rebounds, 2.1 assists, 1.0 steals, and 0.9 blocks per game. But he was always better in the playoffs where he averaged 7.9 points, 5.6 rebounds, 2.4 assists, 1.1 steals, and 0.9 blocks per game and even better in the Finals where he averaged 9.7 points, 5.9 rebounds, 2.9 assists, 1.3 steals, and 1.2 blocks per game. He shot 39.2% from three-point range in his Finals career.

Horry and Steve Kerr, another famous reserve player and clutch shooter, alternated NBA Championships for a decade, and combined to win 12 championships over a 14-year period. Either Kerr or Horry was on the roster of an NBA Finals team from the 1993–94 season through the 2002–03 season, with every one resulting in a victory. Horry's teams were victorious in the NBA Finals in 1994, 1995, 2000, 2001, 2002, 2005 and 2007, while Kerr's teams were winners in the NBA Finals in 1996, 1997, 1998, 1999 and 2003. Each won three titles playing for Phil Jackson-coached teams (Kerr with the Chicago Bulls, Horry with the Los Angeles Lakers), and two with the Gregg Popovich-coached San Antonio Spurs.

In 2009, he was one of the "NBA Legends" to play in the 2009 NBA Asia Challenge against the Philippine Basketball Association All-Stars at Araneta Coliseum in Manila.

Horry was the first player ever to accumulate 100 steals, 100 blocked shots and 100 threes in one season. In 2010, he was inducted into the Alabama Sports Hall of Fame.

Horry has played in three game sevens which went to an overtime period; the 1993 Western Conference Semifinals as a member of the Houston Rockets, the 2002 Western Conference Finals with the Los Angeles Lakers, and the 2006 Western Conference Semifinals with the San Antonio Spurs.

Notable playoff clutch plays

 May 22, 1993, Western Conference Semifinals, Game 7, Houston Rockets at Seattle SuperSonics. With the score tied at 91 late in the fourth quarter and the shot clock winding down, the rookie Horry took a pass from teammate Hakeem Olajuwon and knocked down a midrange jumper to give the Rockets a two-point lead with 32.7 seconds remaining in regulation. However, Horry's heroics were not enough to secure the victory for the Rockets, who succumbed to the Sonics 100–103 in overtime.
 May 22, 1995, Western Conference Finals, Game 1, Houston Rockets at San Antonio Spurs. Horry hit a jumper with 6.5 seconds left to give Houston a 94–93 win over San Antonio.
 June 11, 1995, NBA Finals, Game 3, Orlando Magic at Houston Rockets. With the Rockets up 101–100 with 20 seconds left and the shot clock winding down, Hakeem Olajuwon kicked it out to Horry, who hit a 3 over Orlando's Horace Grant to give Houston a 104–100 lead with 14.1 seconds left. It led them to a 106–103 win and a 3–0 series lead. Houston also won Game 4, 113–101, to complete the sweep and win back-to-back NBA titles.
 June 10, 2001, NBA Finals, Game 3, Los Angeles Lakers at Philadelphia 76ers. With the series tied at 1, the Sixers were down 89–88 with under a minute left after a three-point play by Kevin Ollie. Brian Shaw found Horry wide open in the corner; he then hit a three-pointer with 47.1 seconds left to give the Lakers a 92–88 lead. Horry, who had been a 44% free throw shooter in the playoffs to that point, also made 4 free throws in the final minute to seal a 96–91 victory. The Sixers never recovered.
 April 28, 2002, Western Conference First Round, Game 3, Los Angeles Lakers at Portland Trail Blazers. Down 91–89 with 10.2 seconds left, Kobe Bryant drove on Ruben Patterson and kicked it out to Horry, who hit the game-winning 3 with 2.1 seconds left.
 May 26, 2002, Western Conference Finals, Game 4, Sacramento Kings at Los Angeles Lakers. The Kings led 99–97 with 11.8 seconds left. After Kobe Bryant attempted a game-tying shot and missed, Shaquille O'Neal attempted a putback. When that missed, Vlade Divac knocked the ball away to try to run out the clock. However, it went right to Horry, who hit the game-winning three-pointer at the buzzer to give the Lakers a 100–99 victory and tie the series at 2 going back to Sacramento for Game 5. L.A. eventually beat the Kings in 7 and went on to win their third straight NBA championship.
 June 19, 2005, NBA Finals, Game 5, San Antonio Spurs at Detroit Pistons. Horry inbounded to Manu Ginóbili, who was cornered by two Pistons defenders. Ginóbili passed it back to Horry on the left wing, who then hit a three-pointer with 5.9 seconds left to give the Spurs a 96–95 victory and a 3–2 series lead heading into Game 6. Horry scored 21 points in the fourth quarter and OT combined to carry the Spurs.
 April 30, 2007, Western Conference First Round, Game 4, San Antonio Spurs at Denver Nuggets. With the Spurs up 90–89 with 35 seconds left, Tony Parker drove into the paint drawing his defender and Horry's defender Marcus Camby away. Parker then passed to an open Horry on the right wing, who hit the three-pointer to give the Spurs a 93–89 advantage. The Spurs won 96–89.

NBA career statistics

Regular season

|-
| style="text-align:left;|
| style="text-align:left;|Houston
| 79 || 79 || 29.5 || .474 || .255 || .715 || 5.0 || 2.4 || 1.0 || 1.1 || 10.1
|-
| style="text-align:left; background:#afe6ba;"|†
| style="text-align:left;|Houston
| 81 || 81 || 29.3 || .459 || .324 || .732 || 5.4 || 2.9 || 1.5 || .9 || 9.9
|-
| style="text-align:left; background:#afe6ba;"|†
| style="text-align:left;|Houston
| 64 || 61 || 32.4 || .447 || .379 || .761 || 5.1 || 3.4 || 1.5 || 1.2 || 10.2
|-
| style="text-align:left;|
| style="text-align:left;|Houston
| 71 || 71 || 37.1 || .410 || .366 || .776 || 5.8 || 4.0 || 1.6 || 1.5 || 12.0
|-
| style="text-align:left;|
| style="text-align:left;|Phoenix
| 32 || 15 || 22.5 || .421 || .308 || .640 || 3.7 || 1.7 || .9 || .8 || 6.9
|-
| style="text-align:left;|
| style="text-align:left;|L.A. Lakers
| 22 || 14 || 30.7 || .455 || .329 || .700 || 5.4 || 2.5 || 1.7 || 1.3 || 9.2
|-
| style="text-align:left;|
| style="text-align:left;|L.A. Lakers
| 72 || 71 || 30.4 || .476 || .204 || .692 || 7.5 || 2.3 || 1.6 || 1.3 || 7.4
|-
| style="text-align:left;|
| style="text-align:left;|L.A. Lakers
| 38 || 5 || 19.6 || .459 || .444 || .739 || 4.0 || 1.5 || .9 || 1.0 || 4.9
|-
| style="text-align:left; background:#afe6ba;"|†
| style="text-align:left;|L.A. Lakers
| 76 || 0 || 22.2 || .438 || .309 || .788 || 4.8 || 1.6 || 1.1 || 1.0 || 5.7
|-
| style="text-align:left; background:#afe6ba;"|†
| style="text-align:left;|L.A. Lakers
| 79 || 1 || 20.1 || .387 || .346 || .711 || 3.7 || 1.6 || .7 || .7 || 5.2
|-
| style="text-align:left; background:#afe6ba;"|†
| style="text-align:left;|L.A. Lakers
| 81 || 23 || 26.4 || .398 || .374 || .783 || 5.9 || 2.9 || 1.0 || 1.1 || 6.8
|-
| style="text-align:left;|
| style="text-align:left;|L.A. Lakers
| 80 || 26 || 29.3 || .387 || .288 || .769 || 6.4 || 2.9 || 1.2 || .8 || 6.5
|-
| style="text-align:left;|
| style="text-align:left;|San Antonio
| 81 || 1 || 15.9 || .405 || .380 || .645 || 3.4 || 1.2 || .6 || .6 || 4.8
|-
| style="text-align:left; background:#afe6ba;"|†
| style="text-align:left;|San Antonio
| 75 || 16 || 18.6 || .419 || .370 || .789 || 3.6 || 1.1 || .9 || .8 || 6.0
|-
| style="text-align:left;|
| style="text-align:left;|San Antonio
| 63 || 3 || 18.8 || .384 || .368 || .647 || 3.8 || 1.3 || .7 || .8 || 5.1
|-
| style="text-align:left; background:#afe6ba;"|†
| style="text-align:left;|San Antonio
| 68 || 8 || 16.5 || .359 || .336 || .594 || 3.4 || 1.1 || .7 || .6 || 3.9
|-
| style="text-align:left;|
| style="text-align:left;|San Antonio
| 45 || 5 || 13.0 || .319 || .257 || .643 || 2.4 || 1.0 || .5 || .4 || 2.5
|- class="sortbottom"
| style="text-align:center;" colspan="2"|Career
| 1,107 || 480 || 24.5 || .425 || .341 || .726 || 4.8 || 2.1 || 1.0 || .9 || 7.0

Playoffs

|-
| style="text-align:left;|1993
| style="text-align:left;|Houston
| 12 || 12 || 31.2 || .465 || .300 || .741 || 5.2 || 3.2 || 1.5 || 1.3 || 10.5
|-
| style="text-align:left; background:#afe6ba;"|1994†
| style="text-align:left;|Houston
| 23 || 23 || 33.8 || .434 || .382 || .765 || 6.1 || 3.6 || 1.5 || .9 || 11.7
|-
| style="text-align:left; background:#afe6ba;"|1995†
| style="text-align:left;|Houston
| 22 || 22 || 38.2 || .445 || .400 || .744 || 7.0 || 3.5 || 1.5 || 1.2 || 13.1
|-
| style="text-align:left;|1996
| style="text-align:left;|Houston
| 8 || 8 || 38.5 || .407 || .396 || .435 || 7.1 || 3.0 || 2.6 || 1.6 || 13.1
|-
| style="text-align:left;|1997
| style="text-align:left;|L.A. Lakers
| 9 || 9 || 31.0 || .447 || .429 || .778 || 5.3 || 1.4 || 1.1 || .8 || 6.7
|-
| style="text-align:left;|1998
| style="text-align:left;|L.A. Lakers
| 13 || 13 || 32.5 || .557 || .353 || .683 || 6.5 || 3.1 || 1.1 || 1.1 || 8.6
|-
| style="text-align:left;|1999
| style="text-align:left;|L.A. Lakers
| 8 || 0 || 22.1 || .462 || .417 || .786 || 4.5 || 1.4 || .8 || .8 || 5.0
|-
| style="text-align:left; background:#afe6ba;"|2000†
| style="text-align:left;|L.A. Lakers
| 23 || 0 || 26.9 || .407 || .288 || .702 || 5.3 || 2.5 || .9 || .8 || 7.6
|-
| style="text-align:left; background:#afe6ba;"|2001†
| style="text-align:left;|L.A. Lakers
| 16 || 0 || 23.9 || .368 || .362 || .591 || 5.2 || 1.9 || 1.4 || 1.0 || 5.9
|-
| style="text-align:left; background:#afe6ba;"|2002†
| style="text-align:left;|L.A. Lakers
| 19 || 14 || 37.0 || .449 || .387 || .789 || 8.1 || 3.2 || 1.7 || .8 || 9.3
|-
| style="text-align:left;|2003
| style="text-align:left;|L.A. Lakers
| 12 || 10 || 31.1 || .319 || .053 || .556 || 6.7 || 3.1 || 1.3 || 1.0 || 5.6
|-
| style="text-align:left;|2004
| style="text-align:left;|San Antonio
| 10 || 0 || 21.1 || .465 || .364 || .929 || 6.3 || .9 || .8 || .2 || 6.1
|-
| style="text-align:left; background:#afe6ba;"|2005†
| style="text-align:left;|San Antonio
| 23 || 0 || 26.9 || .448 || .447 || .732 || 5.4 || 2.0 || .9 || .9 || 9.3
|-
| style="text-align:left;|2006
| style="text-align:left;|San Antonio
| 13 || 5 || 17.2 || .405 || .353 || .731 || 3.7 || .8 || .4 || .7 || 4.2
|-
| style="text-align:left; background:#afe6ba;"|2007†
| style="text-align:left;|San Antonio
| 18 || 0 || 20.1 || .417 || .351 || .824 || 3.9 || 1.6 || .6 || 1.3 || 4.3
|-
| style="text-align:left;|2008
| style="text-align:left;|San Antonio
| 15 || 0 || 10.3 || .194 || .227 || .667 || 2.1 || .5 || .3 || .3 || 1.5
|- class="sortbottom"
| style="text-align:center;" colspan="2"|Career
| 244 || 116 || 28.0 || .426 || .359 || .722 || 5.6 || 2.4 || 1.1 || .9 || 7.9

Personal life
Horry lives with his family. His first child, and daughter, Ashlyn, was diagnosed with a rare genetic disorder called 1p36 deletion syndrome, an affliction that develops when part of the first chromosome is missing. She died on June 14, 2011, at the age of 17. His older son Camron Horry plays football at Texas A&M. His younger daughter Jade Horry lives in Los Angeles, California. His younger son Christian Horry is following in his footsteps as a basketball player. Horry coaches his AAU Big Shot basketball team in Los Angeles. On September 29, 2019, he married his long-time girlfriend Candice Madrid. In January 2023, Horry was ejected from his son's high school basketball game between St. Francis High School and Harvard-Westlake for heckling a referee.

See also

 List of NBA players with most championships
 List of National Basketball Association career playoff rebounding leaders
 List of National Basketball Association career playoff steals leaders
 List of National Basketball Association career playoff blocks leaders
 List of National Basketball Association career playoff 3-point scoring leaders

Notes

References

External links

1970 births
Living people
20th-century African-American sportspeople
21st-century African-American sportspeople
African-American basketball players
Alabama Crimson Tide men's basketball players
American men's basketball players
Basketball players from Alabama
Basketball players from Maryland
Houston Rockets draft picks
Houston Rockets players
Los Angeles Lakers players
National Basketball Association broadcasters
Parade High School All-Americans (boys' basketball)
Phoenix Suns players
People from Andalusia, Alabama
People from Harford County, Maryland
Power forwards (basketball)
San Antonio Spurs players
Small forwards
Sportspeople from the Baltimore metropolitan area